Frédéric Serrat (born March 15, 1977 in Grasse, Provence-Alpes-Côte d'Azur) is a French former professional boxer who competed from 1998 to 2005. Serrat's most notable performance as an amateur was winning the silver medal at the 1997 World Amateur Boxing Championships in Budapest, Hungary. There he was defeated in the final by Russia's Aleksandr Lebziak in the light heavyweight division (– 81 kilograms). A year later he turned professional. Serrat last fought in 2005, in a loss by PTS against British boxer Carl Thompson.

External links
 
 Profile on Boxing-Records

1977 births
Living people
Light-heavyweight boxers
French male boxers
AIBA World Boxing Championships medalists
Mediterranean Games bronze medalists for France
Mediterranean Games medalists in boxing
Competitors at the 1997 Mediterranean Games